Alan Patricof (born 22 October 1934) is an American investor who founded the venture capital firm Alan Patricof Associates in 1969. For five years, starting in 2001, he stepped back from day-to-day management of his firm to foster entrepreneurship in the developing world. Patricof returned to found Greycroft in 2006, which by 2022 had $3 billion under management. He’s been a member of numerous boards and commissions in three Administrations. Patricof is now co-founder and chairman of Primetime Partners.

Early life and education
Patricof grew up on the Upper West Side of Manhattan, the son of Russian immigrants. His father was a stockbroker at a small firm. Patricof graduated from Horace Mann School for Boys in 1952. In 2003, he received its Distinguished Achievement Award. He began his career in media selling the Saturday Evening Post in the subway at the age of six. In 1955, he graduated from Ohio State University with a B.A. in finance. He went on to earn an M.B.A. from Columbia University in 1957 while working full-time as an analyst for an investment firm.

Career
Patricof's first full-time job was at the investment counseling firm, Naess & Thomas, now part of Citigroup. That ended when he was drafted by the U.S. Army in March 1958 and reported to Fort Dix, New Jersey as Pvt. 1st Class Patricof. Following his deployment, he returned to New York where he went to work at the development capital firm, Lambert & Co. He was deployed a second time in 1961. At the end of his second tour as Corporal SP3, Patricof joined Central National Corporation (CNC) that managed the pulp and paper fortune of the Gottesman family. While at CNC, the firm invested in New York Magazine which subsequently acquired the Village Voice and New West Magazine. Patricof formed the holding company, Aeneid Equities, whose board he chaired, to manage all three publications. Aeneid went public in 1971. In 1977, Rupert Murdoch acquired all three publications in a hostile takeover.

In 1969, Patricof formed Alan Patricof Associates (APA), with $2.5 million in assets under management and nine individual family management firms as clients. In 1977, APA expanded beyond the U.S. forming venture capital firms in the UK, Alan Patricof Associates Limited, and in France, Alan Patricof Associé that in 1989, to denote the firm’s cross border activities, were renamed Apax, as the firm is known today. Currently, Apax has $75 billion under management with stakes in 120 companies that over the years included AOL, Office Depot, Audible, and Apple Computer.  

(In recognition of his early efforts in founding the first venture capital firm in France, Patricof was awarded the Legion D’Honneur by its president in 2020.) 

In 2001, Patricof stepped back from day-to-day management of Apax to foster entrepreneurship in the developing world, serving as an adviser to the International Finance Corporation, an arm of the World Bank, and joining the boards of nonprofits TechnoServe and the Trickle Up. In 2007, the president of Nigeria appointed him to the country's Presidential Advisory Board.

Returning to the private sector in 2006, Patricof formed Greycroft Partners with $75 million in funds under management. By 2022, that had grown to $3 billion under management with investments in The Huffington Post, Wondery, bought by Amazon in 2021, and Axios, bought by Cox Broadcasting in 2022. 

In 2019, Patricof founded Primetime Partners with Abby Levy, the former Senior Vice President of SoulCycle, to invest in early-stage start-ups that bring products and services to the 25 percent of the population over 60.

Personal life
In 2022, Patricof wrote "No Red Lights," about his career in venture capital, government, philanthropy, the arts, and politics. In its review, The Wall Street Journal noted that Patricof wrote about his failures as well as his success, notably passing on an early opportunity to invest in a coffee shop named Starbucks. 

Patrico began investing in the theater in 1959 when he backed first-time Director Peter Bogdanovic in the Off Broadway production of Clifford Odette's, The Big Knife. After that, he joined the board of King's Road Productions which produced The Last Picture Show that won two Academy Awards in 1972. He subsequently joined the board of directors of Cinecom that produced Merchant Ivory's Room With A View which won an Oscar in 1987. In 1978, he invested in the Manhattan Theater Club’s production of Ain’t Misbehavin’. Most recently he invested in the musical revival of the Billy Wilder film, Some Like it Hot, Tom Stoppard's Leopoldstadt, and Lin Manuel Miranda's Hamilton.

His musical productions include a folk concert at Town Hall in New York City in 1962 starring Oscar Brand and Jean Ritchie. In 1967, he co-produced a music and light show featuring Bobby Goldstein and Joshua White in The Lightworks, which was featured at the Parrish Museum in Water Mill, New York in 2020. 

Patricof has served on the Boards of The Brooklyn Academy of Music, the New York Academy of Science, the Actors Studio School, and the New York Academy of Science.

In 2022, at age 88, Patricof was the oldest competitor to finish the New York City Marathon, his seventh, the high point of his athletic activities that began as a kid on the West Side of Manhattan playing stickball and dodging traffic.

In 1958, Patricof married Bette Hollander. In 1970, he married Susan Hatkoff. They had two sons: Jonathan Patricof, born in 1973 and Jamie Patricof, born in 1976.

Political and other affiliations
On December 20, 2022, Patricof’s nomination to serve on President Joseph Biden’s Board of the Securities Investments Protection Corporation was confirmed by the U.S. Senate. Prior to that, Patricof served in the Bush and Obama administrations as a Member of the Board of Directors of the Millennium Challenge Corporation (2007 to 2012). In Obama’s second term, Patricof served on the board of the President’s Global Development Council. During the Clinton administration, from 1993 to 1995, he chaired the White House Conference on Small Business Commission.

Currently, Patricof is a member of the Council on Foreign Relations. After the death of his wife, Susan, Patricof joined the board of the Finance Committee of Northside Center for Child Development in Harlem where she had been chair for 40 years.

See also
Greycroft Partners
Apax Partners

References

External links
Patricof, Alan. Individual Investors Need Tax Breaks, The New York Times, December 4, 1988

1934 births
American chairpersons of corporations
American company founders
American corporate directors
American people of Russian-Jewish descent
Apax Partners
Angel investors
Columbia Business School alumni
Ohio State University alumni
Private equity and venture capital investors
Living people
New York (state) Democrats